Marcos André Batista dos Santos, best known as Vampeta (born 13 March 1974) is a Brazilian football pundit and retired footballer. A former midfielder, he represented Brazil national team from 1998 until 2002, winning the 1999 Copa América and the 2002 FIFA World Cup.

Vampeta, his nickname, is a fusion of the words "vampiro" (Portuguese for vampire) and "capeta" (Portuguese slang for devil).

Playing career

Club
Vampeta started his career in Salvador, with team Vitória, and later went to Europe with Dutch team PSV Eindhoven, who signed him alongside Ronaldo in the summer of 1994. After a difficult first season, PSV released him on loan to Fluminense, before he returned to the Netherlands as regular of the team that won the first Dutch title in 5 years in 1997.

His good performance in Eindhoven led him back to Brazil were at Corinthians he grew out to become a member of the Brazilian national team. Vampeta then joined Internazionale in summer 2000, being reunited with Ronaldo. He scored in the 2000 Supercoppa Italiana but failed to hold down a first-team place however, he stated that he wanted to leave and went to Rio de Janeiro in December for a vacation. In January 2001, Vampeta went to PSG for €12.2 million as part exchange for Stéphane Dalmat, which Inter retained 50% registration rights on Vampeta .

He was involved in the Adriano (€13.2 million to Inter) and Reinaldo (to PSG) transfer in August 2001, who both played in Flamengo, in exchange for Vampeta who was joint-owned by Inter and PSG. Another half of Vampeta was sold for €9.8 million,

In 2007, he returned to Corinthians, signed a contract until the end of season.

After being released by Corinthians, he signed a contract until mid-2008 with CA Juventus for 2008 Campeonato Paulista.

International
Vampeta made his international debut for Brazil in a friendly match against FR Yugoslavia on 23 September 1998. He then became a regular player for Brazil, being called up for the 1999 Copa América, 1999 FIFA Confederations Cup and 2001 FIFA Confederations Cup. He was also on Brazil's World Cup winning team in 2002, although he only made one substitute appearance during the competition. In total he made 39 appearances for Brazil between 1998 and 2002, scoring 2 goals.

Coaching career
In February 2010, Vampeta was named as the new head coach of Nacional Atlético Clube.

Career statistics

International goals
Score and result list Brazil's goal tally first, score column indicates score after Vampeta goal.

Honours

Club
PSV Eindhoven
Johan Cruijff-schaal: 1996, 1997
Eredivisie: 1997

Corinthians
Campeonato Brasileiro Série A, 1998, 1999
Campeonato Paulista: 1999, 2003
FIFA World Club Championship winner: 2000
Torneio Rio-São Paulo: 2002
Copa do Brasil: 2002

Goiás
Goiás State League: 2006

International
Brazil
FIFA World Cup: 2002
Copa América: 1999

Individual
Bola de Prata (Placar): 1998, 1999

References
 Vampeta on G Magazine 16
 Vampeta on G Magazine 27

External links
 Vampeta Brazilian website 
 archivio.inter.it 
 fifaworldcup.com 
 
 Brazilian FA Database 
 
 Placar 

1974 births
Living people
Brazilian footballers
PSV Eindhoven players
VVV-Venlo players
Sport Club Corinthians Paulista players
Inter Milan players
Goiás Esporte Clube players
Paris Saint-Germain F.C. players
Esporte Clube Vitória players
Brasiliense Futebol Clube players
CR Flamengo footballers
Fluminense FC players
Clube Atlético Juventus players
1999 Copa América players
1999 FIFA Confederations Cup players
2001 FIFA Confederations Cup players
2002 FIFA World Cup players
Association football midfielders
Copa América-winning players
FIFA World Cup-winning players
Brazil international footballers
Sportspeople from Bahia
Campeonato Brasileiro Série A players
Serie A players
Ligue 1 players
Eredivisie players
Brazilian expatriate footballers
Brazilian expatriate sportspeople in Italy
Expatriate footballers in Italy
Brazilian expatriate sportspeople in France
Expatriate footballers in France
Brazilian expatriate sportspeople in Kuwait
Expatriate footballers in Kuwait
Brazilian expatriate sportspeople in the Netherlands
Expatriate footballers in the Netherlands
Kuwait SC players